The 2007–08 Sri Lankan cricket season featured a Test series between Sri Lanka and England.

Honours
 P Saravanamuttu Trophy – Sinhalese Sports Club
 Hatna Trophy – Sinhalese Sports Club
 Most runs – NT Paranavitana 1059 @ 81.46 (HS 236)
 Most wickets – BAW Mendis 68 @ 10.51 (BB 7–37)

Test series
Sri Lanka won the Test series against England 1–0 with two matches drawn:
 1st Test @ Asgiriya Stadium, Kandy – Sri Lanka won by 88 runs
 2nd Test @ Sinhalese Sports Club Ground, Colombo – match drawn
 3rd Test @ Galle International Stadium, Galle – match drawn

External sources
  CricInfo – brief history of Sri Lankan cricket
 CricketArchive – Tournaments in Sri Lanka

Further reading
 Wisden Cricketers' Almanack 2008

Sri Lankan cricket seasons from 2000–01